John Skippe or Skipp (1741–1812) was an English amateur artist.

Life 
John Skipp, born on 7 July 1741, was the son of John Skipp of Upper Hall, Ledbury, Herefordshire. His family had long been settled at Ledbury, a J. Skipp of that place having supported Sir Henry Lingen in 1646. He matriculated at Merton College, Oxford, in 1760, at the age of eighteen.

After leaving the university he travelled in north Italy, and made many drawings, not without merit, from the old masters. A series of careful studies, done in 1773 from the frescoes by Andrea Mantegna in the Church of the Eremitani at Padua, is in the print-room of the British Museum.

Skippe is chiefly noted for his series of wood engravings in chiaroscuro, done in imitation of those works of Ugo da Carpi and other early Italian artists. He had probably seen the chiaroscuro engravings of John Baptist Jackson; but Skippe's are more artistic than Jackson's, and more nearly approach the work of the older masters. Drawings by Skippe of landscape, sacred, and other subjects, executed in bistre with some vigour, are occasionally met with in collections, and were in the nineteenth century sometimes attributed to the old masters.

Skippe died unmarried on 14 October 1812.

References

Citations

Bibliography 

  
 Cust, L. H.; Johnson, Chloe (2011). "Skippe (Skipp), John (1741–1812)". In Oxford Dictionary of National Biography. Oxford University Press.
 Oliver, Valerie Cassel, ed. (2011). "Skippe, John or J. B. or Jean". In Benezit Dictionary of Artists. Oxford University Press.
 Powers, Mary Ann A. (2003). "Skippe, John". In Grove Art Online. Oxford University Press.

1741 births
1812 deaths
18th-century English painters
18th-century engravers